Vegad is a surname found in India. Notable people with the surname include:

Amritlal Vegad (1928–2018), Indian writer and painter
Shankarbhai Vegad (born 1955), Indian politician

See also
Vega (surname)

Indian surnames